Pruszcz  is a village in the administrative district of Gmina Gostycyn, within Tuchola County, Kuyavian-Pomeranian Voivodeship, in north-central Poland.

The village has a population of 870.

History 
Pruszcz was the site of a minor battle during the German invasion of Poland in 1939. On September 1, 1939, the German 3rd Panzer Division, part of General Heinz Guderian's XIX Army Corps, advanced through the village seeking to capture a railway bridge over the Brda River 3 km to the east. Around 09:15 the lead German units encountered elements of the Polish 9th Infantry Division's 34th Infantry Regiment. In the two hour battle that followed the Polish troops succeeded in destroying a Panzer IV medium tank using a 37mm anti-tank gun, while 22 Polish infantrymen were killed in the action. The skirmish bought time for Polish troops to partially burn the bridge over the Brda, delaying the German advance for several hours.

References

Pruszcz